The Carmarthen Journal is a newspaper founded in 1810 in Wales and now based in Carmarthen, the county town of Carmarthenshire, Wales. The building housing the Carmarthen Journal asserts that the Carmarthen Journal is the oldest newspaper in Wales.

In 2012, Local World acquired ownership of Northcliffe Media from Daily Mail and General Trust.

Welsh Newspapers Online has digitised 1340 issues of the Carmarthen Journal (1810–1919) from the newspaper holdings of the National Library of Wales.

See also

References

External links
 Official website of the Carmarthen Journal

Northcliffe Media
Newspapers published in Wales
Companies based in Carmarthenshire
British companies established in 1810
Publications established in 1810
1810 establishments in Wales